Eupithecia niphoreas is a moth of the family Geometridae. It was first described by Edward Meyrick in 1899. It is endemic to the Hawaiian island of Kauai.

It is a bright-colored species with conspicuous orange or reddish scaling. The head is bicolored, with the face black and reddish scaled and the area behind the antennae white.

References

External links

niphoreas
Endemic moths of Hawaii
Moths described in 1899